Ruszkowo may refer to the following places:
Ruszkowo, Lipno County in Kuyavian-Pomeranian Voivodeship (north-central Poland)
Ruszkowo, Rypin County in Kuyavian-Pomeranian Voivodeship (north-central Poland)
Ruszkowo, Ciechanów County in Masovian Voivodeship (east-central Poland)
Ruszkowo, Nowy Dwór Mazowiecki County in Masovian Voivodeship (east-central Poland)
Ruszkowo, Greater Poland Voivodeship (west-central Poland)
Ruszkowo, Warmian-Masurian Voivodeship (north Poland)